The NatWest Women's Quadrangular Series was a Women's One Day International series which took place in England in 2011. The top four ranked teams in the world competed: Australia, England, India and New Zealand. The tournament consisted of a round-robin group stage, in which Australia and England finished as the top two, and then a third-place play-off and a final were contested to decide the final positions. England defeated Australia by 34 runs in the final. The tournament followed a Twenty20 Quadrangular Series, with the same teams competing.

Squads

Points table
Note: P = Played, W = Wins, L = Losses, BP = Bonus Points, Pts = Points, NRR = Net run rate.

 Source:ESPNCricinfo

Fixtures

Group stage

Third-Place play-off

Final

Statistics

Most runs

Most wickets

See also
2011 NatWest Women's T20 Quadrangular Series

References

External links
 Series home at ESPNCricinfo

2011 in English women's cricket
2011 in Australian cricket
2011 in New Zealand cricket
2011 in Indian cricket
2011 in women's cricket
International women's cricket competitions in England
International cricket competitions in 2011
NatWest Group